The Memorial to Enslaved Laborers is a memorial in honor of those enslaved African Americans who built and worked at the University of Virginia, in Charlottesville, Virginia.

Description
The memorial is located near the University of Virginia Corner, east of Brooks Hall and the Rotunda, and consists of a wall of local "Virginia Mist" granite, in the shape of a broken ring, to symbolize broken shackles and completion. Inside it is a second, concentric ring, with a timeline of slavery at the University. The grassy interior of the rings will be used as a gathering place.

Inside the rings, distant conversations are audible.

On the ring, large enough for the names of the 4,000–some enslaved people known to have worked on what is today the university grounds, are engraved the names that are known—578, as of 2020. Another 311 are known by their first name only, their job, or their relation to others who lived and/or worked there. A single engraved word remembers each—Jerry, butler, Agnes, grandmother, midwife, domestic, Billy. Most of the ring is blank, with only notches, representing the other 3,000+ for whom even this basic information is lacking. If more names are discovered they will be added.

The exterior of the outer wall also includes an engraved subtle set of eyes, the work of Eto Otitigbe. They are derived from an image of Isabella Gibbons, an enslaved woman who was owned by professors at the university before emancipation and who went on to become an educator of freed African Americans.

The following words of Gibbons are engraved on the memorial:

"The Memorial is oriented tangent to two paths. The first path leads from the Memorial in the direction of the North Star, which for the enslaved led to freedom. The second path aligns with the sunset on March 3rd, which commemorates the day that Union troops emancipated the local enslaved community at the close of the Civil War. The communities of Charlottesville and the University will observe this important event through the newly instituted Liberation and Freedom Day March through the city. Also sharing the same north/west orientation is the Memorial’s grove of gingko trees that harkens back to the area’s previous use as a productive landscape of fruits and vegetables tended to by enslaved laborers."

History of the memorial

Design
"This was actually a student-led effort from the beginning,” said University of Virginia landscape architect Mary Hughes said. “I guess that effort began in 2007 when the university's board of visitors made a public apology for the institution of slavery.” Another source says that the memorial began with student-led initiatives as early as 2010. There was then an "ideas" competition, and the final design resolution. The President’s Commission on Slavery and the University (PCSU) provided guidance. The Memorial was designed as part of a collaboration between Höweler+Yoon Architecture, Studio&, Gregg Bleam, a local landscape architect, Frank Dukes, and Eto Otitigbe. The University's Board of Visitors approved the design in 2019.

Construction and financing
A different source says that the Board of Visitors approved the design and site in June 2017. Construction began in January 2019, with concrete pouring beginning in early March. The memorial was scheduled for completion in October 2019; the granite slabs were placed in October.

It was to have been formally dedicated on April 11, 2020, but the university shut down shortly before that because of the coronavirus pandemic. It was paid for by $2.5 million in donations, matched by the university. Another source says the cost, estimated at that time at $6 million, was completely covered by private donations.

Gallery

See also
 Charlottesville historic monument controversy
 History of the University of Virginia
 Isabella Gibbons
 Liberation and Freedom Day

References

Further reading

External links
 
 Memorial project web site

Monuments and memorials to victims of slavery in the United States
Enslaved workers at the University of Virginia
Buildings and structures in Charlottesville, Virginia
History of slavery in Virginia
2019 establishments in Virginia
African-American history of Virginia
Outdoor sculptures in Charlottesville, Virginia
People from Charlottesville, Virginia
Presidents of the United States and slavery
African Americans in Virginia
19th-century American slaves
Tourist attractions in Charlottesville, Virginia